Z-CARD is the registered trademark for a foldable  invented by George McDonald when he was a travel writer and consultant for British Airways.

History
McDonald found that traditional fold-out maps were too bulky to carry with him on travel research trips and wanted a more convenient solution. From this the Z-CARD was developed and launched in 1992, with the company as it looks today being founded in 2003.

The Z-CARD was quickly adopted as a marketing communications tool and reached such prevalence that the term z-card is now used as reference to many z-fold or concertina card and not just those produced by Z-CARD Ltd. While Z-CARD pioneered the z-fold market from 1992, a number of other companies have since entered the market by producing their own take on the z-fold format. The original inspiration for the product came from the familiar fold-out map format.

Applications 

The Z-CARD and similar products have been used for a wide range of applications, including internal corporate communications, product and services information and promotional merchandise across all major industries.

Use of technology 

In recent years, cards have featured technology such as Radio-frequency identification, QR codes and Augmented reality.

Awards 

In 2011, Z-CARD won the Chartered Institute of Marketing Excellence Award in the SME category. Previous winners of CIM awards include Saatchi & Saatchi, McCann Erickson and JCDecaux.

In 2010, Z-CARD won South London Business of the Year and the Best Business for Marketing categories at the South London Business Awards.

See also 

 Brochure
 Business card
 Comp card
 Folded leaflet
 Marketing collateral
 Merchant Mariner's Document
 Pamphlet

References 

Types of marketing